Pietrantonio Vicedomini was a Roman Catholic prelate who served as Bishop of Avellino e Frigento (1580–1591) and Bishop of Sant'Angelo dei Lombardi e Bisaccia (1574–1580).

Biography
On 17 November 1574, Pietrantonio Vicedomini was appointed during the papacy of Pope Gregory XIII as Bishop of Sant'Angelo dei Lombardi e Bisaccia.
On 4 November 1580, he was appointed during the papacy of Pope Gregory XIII as Bishop of Avellino e Frigento.
He served as Bishop of Avellino e Frigento until his resignation in 1591.

References

External links and additional sources
 (for Chronology of Bishops) 
 (for Chronology of Bishops) 
 (for Chronology of Bishops) 
 (for Chronology of Bishops) 

16th-century Italian Roman Catholic bishops
Bishops appointed by Pope Gregory XIII